Valeriy Samara (born 29 August 1965) is a Ukrainian rower. He competed in the men's eight event at the 1996 Summer Olympics.

References

1965 births
Living people
Ukrainian male rowers
Olympic rowers of Ukraine
Rowers at the 1996 Summer Olympics
Place of birth missing (living people)